Jincheng is a prefecture-level city in the southeast of Shanxi province, China, bordering Henan province to the south and southeast. It is an industrial city in an area where coal mining is an important industry. The entire city has a population of 2.2 million.

The presence of such a large coal industry has given Jincheng a reputation for air pollution and in recent years the local government has invested heavily to promote better air quality in the city. This includes tree planting, establishing and maintaining large parks and ecological reserves, shutting down or relocating some of the worst-polluting factories, and the generalized use of coalbed methane which burns much cleaner than coal.

History 
Jincheng has a long history. During the Warring States period, Zhao, Wei and Han divided the land of Jinguo and settled the Late Jin monarch in Qinshui County of Jincheng. At the end of the Warring States period, the famous battle of Changping broke out between Qin and Zhao, which was in Gaoping City of Jincheng. After the first emperor of Qin unified the six countries, China was divided into 36 shires, and most of Jincheng and Southeast Shanxi belonged to Shangdang Shire. After the Han dynasty and the Wei dynasty, Jincheng has always belonged to Shangdang Shire and Pingyang Shire. To the Sixteen States, West Yan Murong Yong set up JianxingShire in the south of ShangdangShire, which is also the beginning of Jincheng becoming a Shire today. After that, Jianxing Shire changed its name several times. It was changed to Jianzhou in the Northern Wei dynasty, and then to Zezhou in the Sui dynasty, until it was upgraded to Zezhoufu in the Qing dynasty. They are basically consistent with the five counties under the jurisdiction of Jincheng today. Until the period of the Republic of China, Yuan Shikai issued a policy to change all Chinese State into counties.

Economy 
Jincheng has considerable mineral resources, notably coal. Coal-beds account for more than 56% of the total area. Most of this is anthracite, a very valuable type of coal with few impurities. The anthracite in Jincheng makes up more than a quarter of the total in China and half of the total for Shanxi province. Jincheng also has a large coal mine methane field which was discovered in Qinshui county in 2001.

Both anthracite and coal mine methane were mainly produced by Jincheng Anthracite Mining Group.

Jincheng also has a major Foxconn manufacturing campus which is known for production of over 3 billion RMB / year of fiber optic parts.

Geography 
Jincheng is located in the southeast corner of Shanxi province. The prefecture-level city covers an area of 9,490-square-kilometers. It has 188,920 hectares of cultivated land.

Transportation 
 China National Highway 207
 Taiyuan–Jiaozuo Railway

Jincheng does not have a commercial airport, although the nearby cities of Zhengzhou, Changzhi and Luoyang do.

Climate 
Jincheng has a rather dry, monsoon-influenced humid continental climate (Köppen Dwa), with cold and very dry winters, and hot, humid summers. Typifying the influence of the East Asian Monsoon, over two-thirds of the annual  of precipitation occurs from June to September.

Administrative divisions

Footnotes

External links
 Jincheng Online 
 Jincheng Online 

 
Cities in Shanxi
Prefecture-level divisions of Shanxi
National Forest Cities in China